Malakonda is a village in Valetivari Palem, Nellore district, Andhra Pradesh, India. A temple for Hindu Narasimha (avatar of Vishnu) Sri Malyadri Lakshmi Narasimha Swamy Vari Devasthanam is located here.

Temples

Sri Malyadri Lakshmi Narasimha Swamy Vari Devasthanam
Sri Malyadri Lakshmi Narasimha Swamy Vari Devasthanam is a Narasimha Swamy (avatar of Sri Maha Vishnu). He is the Swamy of Malyadri (Malakonda). A large number of devotees visit the sacred shrine of Lord Lakshmi Narasimha to pay their homage to him. Malyadri is one of the NavaNarasimhas (Nine Narasimhas).

'Malyadri' means hills arranged as a garland (mala). It may also be derived from Malaya (Hill in all of the Southern Indian languages). Malayadri means the Range of Hills, denoting their very geologically dominating nature in an otherwise flat plain land of the South Eastern Deccan Plateau. This hill range is also called the Nalla Mala (beautiful hill) range. The range runs north to south. Starting at Vijayapuri at the extreme north (Nagarjunakonda Dam) to Tirupati at the southern edge. 

At the western edge of Malyadri stands the Ahobhila Narasimha Swamy. At the northwest of Malyadri stands the Sri Sailam. To the south Vrushabhachala kshetram, east side of Malyadri has the Narasimha swamy of Singarayakonda, south side of Malyadri has the Penna River (Pinakini). North side of Malyadri has the Krishna River.  All the devotees of Malyadri give their children names related to Sri Malyadri Narasimha, for males, and related to Sri Mahalakshmi for females.

Sri Mahalakshmi Devi sameta Sri Malayadri Narasimha Swamy Devasthanam
Sri Mahalakshmi Devi Mata is the mother goddess of Malyadri. She is located at the top of the Hill of Malyadri. Here Sri Narasimha Swamy and the Sri Mahalakshmi Devi give blessings to the Devotees.

Other local temples
 Sri Venkateswara Swamy Temple
 Sri Shiva Temple
 Sri Parvati Devi Temple
 Sri Veerabhadra Swamy Temple

Sapta Teerthams
There are seven Teerthams on Malyadri.

 Narasimha Teertham (the current teertham)
 Varuna Teertham
 Kapila Theertham
 Agasthya Teertham
 Sankara Teertham
 Jyothi Teertham
 Indra Teertham

Location 
There are three ways to reach the Malakonda. The east route is via Kandukur and Lingasamudram from Singarayakonda, Prakasham district. The west route is from Pamur, Prakasham district. The south route is via Kaligiri and Kondapuram from either Kavali, Nellore district or Nellore. There are three ways to reach the Temple (Sri Malyadri Lakshmi Narasimha Swamy Vari Devastanam) from Malakonda.

Google Map

References

External links
 Malakonda at Prakasam District

Hindu temples in Prakasam district
Villages in Prakasam district